The Asian and Oceanian Zone is one of the three zones of regional Davis Cup competition in 2009.

In the Asian and Oceanian Zone there are four different groups in which teams compete against each other to advance to the next group.

Format

There will be a Round Robin with eight teams. The eight nations will be divided into two pools of four. The top two teams in each pool will advance to the Final Pool of four teams from which the two highest-placed nations are promoted to Asia and Oceania Group II in 2010. The bottom two teams of each pool of the Round Robin will compete against each other in the Relegation Pool. The two lowest-placed nations are relegated to Asia and Oceania Group IV in 2010.

Information

Venue: Al-Hamadaniah Tennis Complex, Aleppo, Syria

Surface: Hard – outdoors

Dates: 15–19 April

Participating teams

Pool A

Matches

Tajikistan vs. Pacific Oceania

Singapore vs. Lebanon

Singapore vs. Pacific Oceania

Tajikistan vs. Lebanon

Lebanon vs. Pacific Oceania

Singapore vs. Tajikistan

Pool B

Matches

Iran vs. Sri Lanka

Syria vs. Saudi Arabia

Saudi Arabia vs. Sri Lanka

Syria vs. Iran

Syria vs. Sri Lanka

Saudi Arabia vs. Iran

Promotion Pool

 Pacific Oceania and Sri Lanka promoted to Group II in 2010.

Matches

Lebanon vs. Sri Lanka

Syria vs. Pacific Oceania

Pacific Oceania vs. Sri Lanka

Syria vs. Lebanon

Relegation Pool

 Tajikistan and Singapore relegated to Group IV in 2010.

Matches

Iran vs. Tajikistan

Singapore vs. Saudi Arabia

Saudi Arabia vs. Tajikistan

Singapore vs. Iran

External links
Davis Cup draw details

Group III
Davis Cup Asia/Oceania Zone